Mehdigholi Bayat (born 6 January 1979 in Tehran) is a French-Iranian sports administrator who serves as president of the Royal Belgian Football Association and managing director of Royal Charleroi Sporting Club.

Career
Born in Tehran and raised in Cannes, Mehdi Bayat has been the managing director of Charleroi since September 2012. He became President of the Royal Belgian Football Association in 2019.

References

1979 births
Living people
Iranian businesspeople
Iranian emigrants to France
Iranian football chairmen and investors